The Test of Honor (1919) was an American silent film drama produced by Famous Players-Lasky, released by Paramount, directed by John S. Robertson, and starring John Barrymore. Considered the actor's first drama movie role after years of doing film comedies and farces. It is based on author E. Phillips Oppenheim 1906 novel The Malefactor.

The film was made at Famous Players' East Coast facility and released prior to Robertson and Barrymore's famous Dr. Jekyll and Mr. Hyde (1920).

Plot
Martin Wingrave(Barrymore) is arrested and sent to prison for seven years for a crime he didn't commit. While incarcerated he learns that his girlfriend and her male accomplice framed him for the crime. When Wingrave is released he plots revenge against his former girl and her man(Manon, Schable). However he begins a romance with his neighbor, a young woman(Binney) who truly loves him and warms his heart.

Cast
John Barrymore - Martin Wingrave
Constance Binney - Juliet Hollis
Marcia Manon - Ruth Curtis
Robert Schable - Doctor George Lumley
J. W. Johnston - Mr. Curtis
Bigelow Cooper - Judge Ferris
Ned Hay - Lovell
Alma Aiken - Mrs. Farrell
Fred Miller - Zeke

uncredited
Louis Wolheim - Man/Devil in Dream

Preservation status
The Test of Honor is now considered a lost film.

See also
List of lost films
John Barrymore filmography

References

External links

The Test of Honor at SilentEra
Synopsis to The Test of Honor at AllMovie
The Bennington Evening Banner., February 11, 1920, Page Six
John and Louis Wolheim in the film

1919 films
American silent feature films
Lost American films
1919 drama films
Films directed by John S. Robertson
American black-and-white films
Films based on British novels
Famous Players-Lasky films
Silent American drama films
1919 lost films
Lost drama films
1910s American films
1910s English-language films